Bryan Lee Hextall Jr. (born May 23, 1941) is a Canadian former professional ice hockey forward who played in the National Hockey League from 1962 to 1976. Hextall comes from a family rich in the history of hockey. The son of Bryan Hextall, brother of Dennis Hextall, father of Ron Hextall, and grandfather of Brett Hextall, he played the majority of his NHL career with the Pittsburgh Penguins. He spent time with the New York Rangers, Atlanta Flames, Detroit Red Wings, and the Minnesota North Stars, as well as with additional teams in the American Hockey League, WHL, CSHL, and the EPHL. He retired from the NHL after 549 games, with a total of 99 goals, 161 assists, 260 points, and 736 penalty minutes.

Career statistics

Regular season and playoffs

Awards and achievements 
Calder Cup Championship AHL (1968)
WHL Championship (1969)
Honoured Member of the Manitoba Hockey Hall of Fame

See also
Notable families in the NHL

External links

1941 births
Living people
Atlanta Flames players
Baltimore Clippers players
Brandon Wheat Kings players
Canadian ice hockey centres
Detroit Red Wings players
Kitchener Beavers (EPHL) players
Minnesota North Stars players
New York Rangers players
Pittsburgh Penguins players
Rochester Americans players
Ice hockey people from Winnipeg
Vancouver Canucks (WHL) players
Winnipeg Rangers players